The Green Knight is the 25th novel by Irish writer and philosopher Iris Murdoch, first published in 1993.

Plot summary
The lives of Louise Anderson and her daughters Aleph, Sefton and Moy become intertwined with a mystical character whose destiny both affects and informs the novel's central conflicts which include a murder that never actually occurs, sibling rivalry, love triangles, and one extremely sentient dog who dearly misses his owner.  This novel loosely parodies the medieval poem Sir Gawain and the Green Knight; however, it is largely a comedy of errors with bizarre twists and turns in circumstances that threaten the stability of a circle of friends in a London community.

Characters
Lucas Graffe, a dark, Byronic figure who mentally tortures his brother Clement, the antagonist
Louise Anderson, an emotionally repressed mother of three girls
Sefton, daughter of Louise, a student and lover of history 
Aleph, daughter of Louise, the beautiful and elusive eldest sister
Moy, daughter of Louise, a sensitive lover of all living things
Joan, a childhood friend of Louise and mother of Harvey
Harvey, family friend of the Anderson sisters and Joan's son
Clement, brother of Lucas
Bellamy, an ascetic and aspiring monk
Peter Mir, a strange figure who becomes entwined in the lives of the others
Anax, a border collie who desperately misses Bellamy who gave him up to prove his Christian convictions

Reception
Publishers Weekly referred to the book as "...far from perfect, but passages of intense writing and keen depictions of people grappling with afflictions of the soul remind us that Murdoch's perspective is invaluable."

References

1993 British novels
Novels by Iris Murdoch
British magic realism novels
Novels set in London
Chatto & Windus books
Parody novels
Novels based on poems